Thomas Bingham Orr  (21 April 1924 – 20 June 1972) was a Scottish footballer, who played as an inside forward for Greenock Morton.

Playing for Morton Juniors, Orr appeared in the 1940 Scottish Junior Cup Final alongside Nelson Black. Morton lost 1–0 to Maryhill.

As well as his 86 goals in 257 league appearances for Greenock Morton, Orr totalled 18 in 56 in the League Cup. He also scored three times in 28 Scottish Cup matches, and was a member of the side that reached the final in 1948.

Orr was capped for the Scotland national team twice, against Wales and Northern Ireland, both in 1951. He scored the first goal against Northern Ireland in a 3–0 win.

Orr retired from football in 1958. His son Neil Orr also became a professional footballer.

See also
List of one-club men in association football

References

Sources
 
 
 

1924 births
1972 deaths
Scottish footballers
Scotland international footballers
Association football inside forwards
Greenock Morton F.C. players
Arsenal F.C. wartime guest players
Footballers from Greenock
Scottish Football League players
Place of death missing
Scottish Junior Football Association players